The 2018–19 season is Motherwell's thirty-fourth consecutive season in the top flight of Scottish football and the sixth in the newly established Scottish Premiership, having been promoted from the Scottish First Division at the end of the 1984–85 season. Motherwell will also competed in the League Cup and the Scottish Cup,

Season review

Pre-season
On 26 June 2018, Maguire signed a new one-year contract with Motherwell, until the end of the 2018–19 season.

Transfers
On 5 June 2018, Motherwell announced the signing of Mark Gillespie on a two-year contract from Walsall, with the transfer becoming official when the Scottish Transfer window opened on 9 June.

On 7 June 2018, Motherwell announced the signing of Liam Donnelly on an initial two-year contract from Hartlepool United.

On 13 June 2018, Motherwell announced the signing of Danny Johnson on a two-year contract from Gateshead.

Motherwell announced their fourth signing of the summer on 19 June 2018, with Aaron Taylor-Sinclair signing a one-year contract with the club following the expiration of his Plymouth Argyle contract on 30 June 2018. The following day, 20 June, Motherwell announced the signing of Alex Rodriguez on an initial one-year contract, whilst Ross MacLean moved to Greenock Morton on a season-long loan deal.

On 2 July, Shea Gordon joined Partick Thistle on loan for the season.

On 7 July, Jake Hastie joined Alloa Athletic on loan until January 2019. On 10 July, Motherwell announced that Broque Watson had joined the reserve team from Celtic and Neil McLaughlin had joined from Partick Thistle and would be immediately loaned out to Stirling Albion for the season.

On 16 July, Motherwell announced the season-long loan signing of Conor Sammon from Hearts.

On 3 August, Motherwell announced that Cédric Kipré had left the club to join Wigan Athletic for an undisclosed fee.

On 9 August, Tom Aldred returned to Motherwell for a second loan-spell, agreeing a deal until the end of the season. The next day, Christian Mbulu signed a one-year contract with Motherwell after his release from Millwall at the end of the previous season.

On 10 December 2018, Vancouver Whitecaps announced that they had signed Rose to a two-year contract, following the acquisition of his MLS rights from Seattle Sounders, with Motherwell confirming that Rose would join Vancouver Whitecaps on 1 January 2019.

On 1 January 2019, Barry Maguire joined Queen of the South on loan for the remainder of the season, whilst Jason Krones and Jordan Armstrong left the club after the expiration of their contracts. The following day, 2 January, Ryan Bowman moved permanently to Exeter City for an undisclosed fee.

On 3 January 2019, Ross MacLean ended his loan deal with Greenock Morton to join Falkirk on a permanent basis. 2 days later, 5 January, Ross McCormack joined on loan until the end of the season from Aston Villa after his loan deal with Central Coast Mariners was cut short. On 7 January, Gboly Ariyibi joined Motherwell on loan for the remainder of the season from Nottingham Forest.

On 30 January 2019, David Turnbull signed a new contract until the summer of 2021, whilst Aaron Taylor-Sinclair joined Crewe Alexandra on loan for the rest of the season.

On 31 January, Transfer deadline day, Broque Watson joined East Fife on loan for the remainder of the season, George Newell went on loan to Albion Rovers for the rest of the season, and Gaël Bigirimana left the club in a permanent move to Hibernian.

On 7 March, Barry Maguire signed a new contract, until the summer of 2020, whilst Liam Grimshaw agreed a new deal on 12 March, keeping him at club until the summer of 2020.

On 29 March, Adam Livingstone extended his contract until the summer of 2020.

On 10 April, Jamie Semple extended his contract until the summer of 2021.

On 11 April, Motherwell signed a pre-contract agreement with Inverness Caledonian Thistle defender Declan Gallagher, on a contract that will run until the summer of 2021. 6 days later, 17 April, Motherwell signed another pre-contract agreement with an Inverness Caledonian Thistle player, with Liam Polworth agreeing to a contract that will also run until the summer of 2021.

On 1 May, Rangers announced that they had signed Jake Hastie to a pre-contract agreement, with the winger signing a four-year contract to begin once his Motherwell contract ends.
On 15 May, Motherwell confirmed that Shea Gordon would leave the club when his contract expired at the end of the season, and would sign a permanent deal with Partick Thistle where he had been on a season-long loan.

On 21 May, Motherwell announced that they had offered new contracts to Craig Tanner and Chris Cadden, whilst first teamer Christian Mbulu, Aaron Taylor-Sinclair, Elliott Frear, Carl McHugh, Alex Rodriguez, Curtis Main, George Newell and Jake Hastie would be leaving the club at the end of their contracts after turning down new deals or not being offered new terms. At the same time, Motherwell also confirmed that youngsters Shaun Bowers, Akeal Rehman, Shea Gordon, Liam Brown, Kyle MacDonald, Broque Watson and Neil McLaughlin would also be leaving the club.

Transfers

In

 Gillespie's move was announced on the above date, becoming official when the Scottish transfer window opened on 9 June.

Loans in

Out

 Rose move was announced on the above date, becoming official when the Scottish transfer window opened on 1 January.

Loans out

Released

 Hastie & Gordon's moves were announced on the above date, with their Motherwell contracts officially ending on 31 May 2019.

Trial

Squad

Out on loan

Left club during season

Friendlies

Competitions

Premiership

League table

Results by round

Results summary

Results

Scottish Cup

League Cup

Group stage

Table

Matches

Knockout phase

Challenge Cup

Squad statistics

Appearances

|-
|colspan="12"|Players away from the club on loan:

|-
|colspan="12"|Players who left Motherwell during the season:

|}

Goal scorers

Disciplinary record

See also
 List of Motherwell F.C. seasons

References

External links
 Motherwell F.C. Website
 BBC My Club Page
 Motherwell F.C. Newsnow

Motherwell F.C. seasons
Motherwell